Jemtland is a place in Maine, United States. It's named after Jämtland in Sweden, because many of the settlers came from there.

References

External links
Maine Swedish Colony

Populated places in Aroostook County, Maine